Celso Rafael Ayala Gavilán (born 20 August 1970) is a Paraguayan football manager and former player who played as a centre-back.

Career
With 85 caps and six goals, Ayala one of the most capped players in the Paraguay national team.  Ayala became a key player in Paraguay's outstanding defensive line in the 1990s, along with fellow defenders Francisco Arce and Carlos Gamarra. His characteristics were leadership in the field, good positioning and superb tackling and heading skills. Ayala made his international debut for the Paraguay national football team on 3 March 1993 in the Copa Paz de Chico match against Bolivia (1–0 win) as a substitute.

Honours
Olimpia Asunción
 Nehru Cup: 1990
 Supercopa Sudamericana: 1990
 Copa Libertadores de America: 1990
 Copa Interamericana runner-up: 1990
 Intercontinental Cup runner-up: 1990
 Recopa Sudamericana: 1991
 Torneo Republica: 1992 (undefeated)
 Copa CONMEBOL runner-up: 1992
 Paraguayan league: 1993 (undefeated)
 Supercopa Masters runner-up: 1994

River Plate
 Copa Libertadores: 1996
 Primera División Argentina: Apertura 1996, Clausura, 1997, Apertura 1997, Clausura 2002, Clausura 2003, Clausura 2004
 Intercontinental Cup runner-up: 1996
 Supercopa Sudamericana: 1997

Real Betis
 Ramon de Carranza Trophy: 1999

Colo-Colo
 Torneo Apertura: 2006

Paraguay U-23
 U-23 South American championship: 1992

References

External links
International statistics at rsssf

1970 births
Living people
Sportspeople from Asunción
Paraguayan footballers
Club Olimpia footballers
Rosario Central footballers
Club Atlético River Plate footballers
Association football defenders
La Liga players
Atlético Madrid footballers
Real Betis players
São Paulo FC players
Colo-Colo footballers
Olympic footballers of Paraguay
Footballers at the 1992 Summer Olympics
Paraguay international footballers
Chilean Primera División players
Argentine Primera División players
1993 Copa América players
1995 Copa América players
1997 Copa América players
1998 FIFA World Cup players
1999 Copa América players
2002 FIFA World Cup players
Copa Libertadores-winning players
Paraguayan football managers
Club Deportivo Guabirá managers
Sport Boys Warnes managers
Club Nacional managers
Club Sol de América managers
Paraguayan Primera División managers
Bolivian Primera División managers
Paraguayan expatriate footballers
Paraguayan expatriate sportspeople in Argentina
Expatriate footballers in Argentina
Paraguayan expatriate sportspeople in Spain
Expatriate footballers in Spain
Paraguayan expatriate sportspeople in Brazil
Expatriate footballers in Brazil
Paraguayan expatriate sportspeople in Chile
Expatriate footballers in Chile
Paraguayan expatriate sportspeople in Bolivia
Expatriate football managers in Bolivia
Sportivo Luqueño managers
Club Petrolero managers
Deportivo Capiatá managers
Independiente F.B.C. managers